Pozzonovo is a comune (municipality) in the Province of Padua in the Italian region Veneto, located about  southwest of Venice and about  southwest of Padua.

Pozzonovo borders the following municipalities: Anguillara Veneta, Boara Pisani, Monselice, Solesino, Stanghella, Tribano.

Demographic evolution

References

Cities and towns in Veneto